is a railway station on the Minobu Line of Central Japan Railway Company (JR Central) located in the town of Minobu, Minamikoma District, Yamanashi Prefecture, Japan.

Lines
Ichinose Station is served by the Minobu Line and is located 56.1 kilometers from the southern terminus of the line at Fuji Station.

Layout
Ichinose Station has one side platform serving a single bi-directional track. There is no station building, but only a small rain shelter on the platform, and a separate toilet. The station is unattended.

Adjacent stations

History
Ichinose Station was opened on May 10, 1932 as a station on the original Fuji-Minobu Line. It has been unattended since the day of its opening. The line came under control of the Japanese Government Railways on May 1, 1941. The JGR became the JNR (Japan National Railway) after World War II. Along with the division and privatization of JNR on April 1, 1987, the station came under the control and operation of the Central Japan Railway Company.

Surrounding area
 The station is located in a rural area with only 3-4 houses nearby.

See also
 List of railway stations in Japan

External links

  Minobu Line station information	

Railway stations in Japan opened in 1932
Railway stations in Yamanashi Prefecture
Minobu Line
Minobu, Yamanashi